The Xinmin railway station is a railway station in Xinmin, Liaoning, China. The station is served by the Beijing-Harbin Railway, a passenger railway that passes between Beijing and Harbin.

References

Railway stations in Liaoning
Stations on the Beijing–Harbin High-Speed Railway